Operation Pierce Arrow was a U.S. bombing campaign at the beginning of the Vietnam War.

The operation consisted of 64 strike sorties of aircraft from the aircraft carriers  and  against the torpedo boat bases of Hon Gai, Loc Chao, Quang Khe, and Phuc Loi, and the oil storage depot at Vinh. The U.S. lost two aircraft to anti-aircraft fire, with one pilot killed, Lieutenant Richard Sather, piloting an A-1 Skyraider. Another, Lt. (jg) Everett Alvarez Jr. an A-4 Skyhawk pilot, became the first U.S. Navy prisoner of war in Vietnam. North Vietnam claimed to have shot down eight U.S. aircraft.

Pilots estimated that the Vinh raid destroyed 10 percent of North Vietnam's entire petroleum storage, together with the destruction of or damage to 29 P-4 torpedo boats or gunboats.

This was the start of U.S. air operations over North Vietnam and Southeast Asia, attempting to destroy the infrastructure, war material, and military units needed by North Vietnam to prosecute the guerrilla war in the South. The air operations following Pierce Arrow would swell so that by war's end, the United States bombing campaign was the longest and heaviest in history. The 7,662,000 tons of bombs dropped in Southeast Asia during the Vietnam War nearly quadrupled the 2,150,000 tons the U.S. had dropped during World War II.

References

Conflicts in 1964
Pierce Arrow
Pierce Arrow
Pierce Arrow
Pierce Arrow